David Herbert Donald (October 1, 1920 – May 17, 2009) was an American historian, best known for his 1995 biography of Abraham Lincoln. He twice won the Pulitzer Prize for Biography for earlier works; he published more than 30 books on United States political and literary figures and the history of the American South.

Early life and education
David Herbert Donald was born in Goodman, Mississippi, a town in the center of Holmes County. The county's western border is formed by the Yazoo River and it is part of the Mississippi-Yazoo Delta.

Career
Majoring in history and sociology, Donald earned his bachelor's degree from Millsaps College in Jackson, Mississippi. After earning a Master's degree in history (1942) at the University of Illinois at Urbana-Champaign, he earned his PhD in 1946 under eminent Lincoln scholar James G. Randall at the same institution. Randall as a mentor influenced Donald's life and career. He encouraged his protégé to write his dissertation on Abraham Lincoln's law partner, William Herndon. Donald adapted and published the dissertation as his first book, Lincoln's Herndon (1948).

After completing his doctorate, Donald taught at Columbia University, Johns Hopkins University and, from 1973, Harvard University. He also taught at Smith College, the University of North Wales (on a Fulbright grant), Princeton University, University College London and served as Harmsworth Professor of American History at Oxford University. At Johns Hopkins, Columbia, and Harvard he trained dozens of graduate students, including Heather Cox Richardson, Jean H. Baker, William J. Cooper, Jr., Michael Holt, Irwin Unger, Ari Hoogenboom, and Richard R. John.

Donald served as president of the Southern Historical Association.  Donald also served on the editorial board for the Papers of Abraham Lincoln.

Donald was the Charles Warren Professor of American History (emeritus from 1991) at Harvard University. He wrote more than thirty books, including well-received biographies of Abraham Lincoln, Thomas Wolfe and Charles Sumner. He specialized in the American Civil War and Reconstruction periods, and in the history of the American South.

Legacy and honors
Donald received the Pulitzer Prize for Biography or Autobiography twice, in 1961 for Charles Sumner and the Coming of the Civil War and in 1988 for Look Homeward: A Life of Thomas Wolfe. He also received several honorary degrees.

Donald received the American Academy of Achievement's Golden Plate Award in 1997.

Donald was inducted as a Laureate of The Lincoln Academy of Illinois and awarded the Order of Lincoln (the State's highest honor) by the Governor of Illinois in 2008 in the area of Communications and Education.

In 2000, Donald received The Lincoln Forum's Richard Nelson Current Award of Achievement.

Works
In his introduction, Carl Sandburg, the poet and Lincoln biographer, hailed Donald's first book as the answer to scholars' prayers: "When is someone going to do the life of Bill Herndon. Isn't it about time? Now the question is out."

David M. Potter, a Civil War scholar, said that Donald's biography of Charles Sumner portrayed "Sumner as a man with acute psychological inadequacies" and exposed Sumner's "facade of pompous rectitude." Donald's evenhanded approach to Sumner, Potter concluded, was a model for biographers working with a difficult subject. "If it does not make Sumner attractive [the book] certainly makes him understandable."

Personal life and death

Donald lived in Lincoln, Massachusetts, with his wife Aida DiPace Donald, who is an historian and author. His wife also served as a senior editor and then as editor-in-chief at the Harvard University Press. He died of heart failure in Boston on May 17, 2009. Donald was survived by his wife, his son Bruce Donald and two granddaughters.

Books

 Lincoln's Herndon (1948)
 Divided We Fought: A Pictorial History of the War, 1861—1865 (1952)
 Editor, Inside Lincoln's Cabinet: The Civil War Diaries of Salmon P. Chase. (1954)
  Lincoln Reconsidered: Essays on the Civil War Era (1956, 2nd edition 1961, 3rd edition 2001).
 Charles Sumner and the Coming of the Civil War (1960). Pulitzer Prize-winning scholarly biography to 1860.
 The Civil War and Reconstruction (1961; 2001), 2001 edition with Jean H. Baker & Michael F. Holt; 1961 edition with James G. Randall.
 Editor, Why the North Won the Civil War (1962) (revised ed. 1996).
 Editor with Aida DiPace Donald, Diary of Charles Francis Adams, Volumes 1 and 2, January 1820 - September 1829 (1964), Harvard University Press.
 The Politics of Reconstruction, 1863-1867 (1965)
 Charles Sumner and the Rights of Man  (1970). Biography after 1860.
 Look Homeward: A Life of Thomas Wolfe (1987)().
 Lincoln (1995) 
 Lincoln at Home: Two Glimpses of Abraham Lincoln's Domestic Life  (1999) .
 We Are Lincoln Men: Abraham Lincoln and His Friends (2003).

Sources
 Paul Goodman, "David Donald's Charles Sumner Reconsidered" in The New England Quarterly, Vol. 37, No. 3. (Sep., 1964), pp. 373–387.online at JSTOR
   Ari Hoogenboom, "David Herbert Donald: A Celebration," in A Master's Due: Essays in Honor of David Herbert Donald, ed. William J. Cooper, Jr., et al.(Louisiana State University Press, 1985), 1—15.

References

External links
 
 In Depth interview with Donald, June 2, 2002.
 David Herbert Donald, Daily Telegraph obituary.
 New York Times obituary May 19, 2009.

20th-century American biographers
American male biographers
20th-century American historians
American male non-fiction writers
Historians of the American Civil War
Columbia University faculty
Harvard University faculty
Historians of the United States
Johns Hopkins University faculty
People from Goodman, Mississippi
Pulitzer Prize for Biography or Autobiography winners
Lincoln Prize winners
University of Illinois Urbana-Champaign alumni
1920 births
2009 deaths
People from Lincoln, Massachusetts
Harold Vyvyan Harmsworth Professors of American History
Historians of Abraham Lincoln
20th-century American male writers